Sokikom (so-kee-kom) is a math program where elementary students learn through a team-based game. Based in San Jose, CA, Sokikom was founded in 2008 by Snehal Patel.

Products

Math Learning Games
Sokikom's online math games are rooted in the nationally recognized standards of the National Council of Teachers of Mathematics Curriculum Focal Points for Grades PreK-8 and align to the Common Core Standards for grades k-5. Sokikom is designed as an adaptive learning experience.

Classroom Management
Using a computer, tablet, or mobile device, teachers can award "Class Cash" to students individual virtual accounts. Students can then use these rewards in an online store to purchase items for their character/avatar.

Awards & Reviews
Sokikom received a 2011 BESSIE Award from ComputED Gazette, recognizing Sokikom's multiplayer math games in the category Best for Early Elementary Students. It was further recognized in the category Best Gaming & Adaptive Learning Company at the 2011 Education Innovation Summit at SkySong, the Arizona State University Scottsdale Innovation Center, and in 2011, received a Success Award from the Arizona Small Business Development Center Network (AZSBDC) for its contribution to the Arizona economy. The Association of Educational Publishers presented Sokikom with a Distinguished Achievement Award in the category of Mathematics Curriculum.

Sokikom Meaning/Origin
Sokikom links parts of the words “social” and “communal” with two k's, which, when backed against one another, look similar to the mathematical symbol for a natural join. Sokikom means joining “social” and “community” to improve learning.

Funding
The company was initially funded by grants from the Institute of Education Sciences, which is the main research arm of the U.S. Department of Education, and is currently funded by private investors.

References

Education companies of the United States